The 2015 Anning Open was a professional tennis tournament played on outdoor clay courts. It was the fourth edition for men and second edition for women of the tournament and part of the 2015 ATP Challenger Tour and the 2015 ITF Women's Circuit, offering a total of $50,000+H for men $75,000 women in prize money. It took place in Anning, China, on 27 April–3 May for men and 4–10 May 2015 for women.

Men's singles main draw entrants

Seeds 

 1 Rankings as of 27 April 2015

Other entrants 
The following players received wildcards into the singles main draw:
  Zheng Wei Qiang
  Ouyang Bowen
  Cao Zhaoyi
  Ning  Yuqing

The following players received entry from the qualifying draw:
  Lee Hyung-taik
  Hong Seong-chan
  Toni Androić
  Divij Sharan

The following player received entry from a protected ranking:
  Karunuday Singh

Women's singles main draw entrants

Seeds 

 1 Rankings as of 27 April 2015

Other entrants 
The following players received wildcards into the singles main draw:
  Sun Xuliu
  Wu Yunjun
  Ye Qiuyu
  Zhao Di

The following players received entry from the qualifying draw:
  Gai Ao
  Gao Xinyu
  Alexa Guarachi
  You Xiaodi

Champions

Men's singles

 Franko Škugor def.  Gavin van Peperzeel, 7–5, 6–2

Women's singles

 Zheng Saisai def.  Han Xinyun, 6–4, 3–6, 6–4

Men's doubles

 Bai Yan /  Wu Di def.  Karunuday Singh /  Andrew Whittington, 6–3, 6–4

Women's doubles

 Xu Yifan  /  Zheng Saisai def.  Yang Zhaoxuan /  Ye Qiuyu, 7–5, 6–2

External links 
 2015 ITF Women's Circuit – Anning at ITFtennis.com

Anning Open
Anning Open
Anning Open
Kunming Open